Taqwa Pinero (born Taquan Dean on August 6, 1983) is an American professional basketball player who lastly played for Élan Béarnais Pau-Lacq-Orthez of the LNB Pro A.

Amateur career
He was born in Red Bank, New Jersey and attended Neptune High School in Neptune Township, New Jersey.

Dean was a star college basketball player for the University of Louisville through 2006, where he majored in justice administration. Throughout his four-year college career, he scored 1,657 career points, and made 361 three-point field goals. Considered a lock to be drafted in the first round of the 2005 NBA Draft after Louisville's great season and subsequent run through the NCAA Tournament, he decided to stay at Louisville for his senior season. This proved to be a mistake, draft stock wise, as Dean spent much of his senior season on the bench with an ankle injury.

Professional career
He went undrafted in the 2006 NBA Draft, and he signed with Angelico Biella of the Italian League. After half of the season, he transferred to the Russian Super League club Dynamo Moscow. In 2007, he signed with the Italian 2nd Division team Junior Casale Monferrato.

In July 2008, Dean played for the Phoenix Suns in the Las Vegas NBA Summer League. In 2008, he signed with the Spanish Liga ACB club Murcia.

In 2009, he joined the Euroleague club Unicaja Málaga of Spain by signing a one-year contract. He moved for a short time to Saski Baskonia before finishing the 2009–10 season with Greek Kavala B.C. He then signed with Italian club Air Avellino for the 2010–11 season.

In August 2014, he signed with Spanish club San Sebastián Gipuzkoa. On April 9, 2015, he left San Sebastián, On and on April 27, he signed with Mahram Tehran of the Iranian Super League.

On July 11, 2015, Dean signed with Socar Petkim of the Turkish Basketball Second League. On April 19, 2016, he signed with his former team San Sebastián Gipuzkoa for the rest of the season.

On October 10, 2016, after changing legally his name to Taqwa Pinero, he signed with Hoops Club of the Lebanese Basketball League.

Two months later, Pinero signed with Spanish team Iberostar Tenerife. In February 2017, Pinero leaves the team. Later that month, he signed with French club Élan Béarnais Pau-Lacq-Orthez for the rest of the 2016–17 Pro A season. On June 2, 2017, he signed a two-year contract extension with Pau-Orthez.

Personal life
In October 2016, he changed his name from Taquan Dean to Taqwa Pinero, as he found after a DNA test that his supposed father was not the real one, adopting finally the surname of the new one and as he converted to Islam, taking an Arabic given name.

References

External links
Profile at euroleague.net
Profile at realgm.com
Profile at fiba.com

1983 births
Living people
A.S. Junior Pallacanestro Casale players
African-American basketball players
African-American Muslims
Aliağa Petkim basketball players
American expatriate basketball people in France
American expatriate basketball people in Greece
American expatriate basketball people in Iran
American expatriate basketball people in Italy
American expatriate basketball people in Lebanon
American expatriate basketball people in Russia
American expatriate basketball people in Spain
American expatriate basketball people in Turkey
American men's basketball players
BC Dynamo Moscow players
Baloncesto Málaga players
Basketball players from New Jersey
CB Canarias players
CB Murcia players
Converts to Islam
Élan Béarnais players
Gipuzkoa Basket players
Greek Basket League players
Kavala B.C. players
Liga ACB players
Louisville Cardinals men's basketball players
Mahram Tehran BC players
Naturalised citizens of Spain
Neptune High School alumni
Pallacanestro Biella players
People from Neptune Township, New Jersey
People from Red Bank, New Jersey
Petkim Spor players
S.S. Felice Scandone players
Saski Baskonia players
Shooting guards
Sportspeople from Monmouth County, New Jersey
Valencia Basket players
21st-century African-American sportspeople
20th-century African-American people